Michel Kamanzi (born 29 September 1979) is a Rwandan former footballer who is last known to have played as a midfielder for TuSpo Richrath.

Career

Kamanzi moved to Germany on the recommendation of a compatriot.

In 2004, Kamanzi signed for German fourth division side after playing for SG Betzdorf in the German fifth division.

References

External links

 

Rwandan footballers
Rwandan expatriate footballers
Rayon Sports F.C. players
Rwanda international footballers
Living people
Expatriate footballers in Germany
Rwandan expatriates in Germany
1979 births
TuRU Düsseldorf players
Sportspeople from Bujumbura
Association football midfielders